Zlatan Ibrahimović is a Swedish professional association footballer who has represented Sweden at international level since 2001. As well as Sweden, he was eligible to represent Bosnia and Herzegovina, or Croatia. He made his debut for Sweden in a 0–0 draw against the Faroe Islands on 31 January 2001, scoring his first international goal later that year against Azerbaijan. He briefly retired in October 2009 when Sweden failed to qualify for the 2010 FIFA World Cup, but returned to the international team as joint-captain the following August. During his international career, he has scored 62 goals in 121 international appearances, making him Sweden's all-time top scorer, surpassing Sven Rydell's record with two goals against Estonia at the Friends Arena during a friendly in September 2014. On 21 June 2016, Ibrahimović announced his retirement from international football after UEFA Euro 2016, playing his last match for Sweden against Belgium the following day. However, he would reverse this decision more than four years later, being recalled to the national team in March 2021 at the age of 39.

Ibrahimović scored his first hat-trick on 4 September 2004, when he scored four goals against Malta, the team against which he has scored the most times, with six. He has scored four international hat-tricks; in addition to the one against Malta; he scored three goals in a game against Finland during the UEFA Euro 2012 qualifying competition, four in a friendly against England in 2012, and three in a friendly against Norway in 2013. More than half of Ibrahimović's goals have come at home, having scored twenty at the Friends Arena, eleven at the Råsunda Stadium, five at Ullevi, two at the Swedbank Stadion and one at Gamla Ullevi.

The majority of Ibrahimović's goals have come in qualifying matches. He has scored nineteen in European Championship qualifiers, including eleven during the 2016 qualifying round, where he finished as the second-highest scorer, two behind Poland's Robert Lewandowski. Ibrahimović has also scored nineteen times in World Cup qualifiers. He has never scored a goal in the World Cup finals but has scored six in European Championship finals. The remainder of Ibrahimović's goals, eighteen, were scored in friendlies.

International goals

Scores and results list Sweden's goal tally first.

Hat-tricks

Statistics

See also
 List of men's footballers with 50 or more international goals
 List of top international men's football goal scorers by country
 Sweden national football team records and statistics

References

Sweden national football team records and statistics
Ibrahimovic, Zlatan